Hwang Jong-Hyun (born 20 May 1975) is a field hockey player from South Korea, who was a member of the Men's National Team that won the silver medal at the 2000 Summer Olympics in Sydney. In the final the Asians were beaten by title holders, the Netherlands, after penalty strokes. He is nicknamed Jonathan, and also competed at the 2004 Summer Olympics in Athens.

External links

 Profile on Athens 2004 Web Site

1975 births
Living people
South Korean male field hockey players
Olympic field hockey players of South Korea
Field hockey players at the 2000 Summer Olympics
Field hockey players at the 2004 Summer Olympics
Olympic silver medalists for South Korea
2002 Men's Hockey World Cup players
Asian Games medalists in field hockey
Field hockey players at the 2002 Asian Games
Olympic medalists in field hockey
Medalists at the 2000 Summer Olympics
Asian Games gold medalists for South Korea
Medalists at the 2002 Asian Games